300P/Catalina is a periodic, near-Earth comet in the Solar System with an orbital period of 4.4 years. It is the second comet ever listed on the Sentry Risk Table. At  in diameter, it is one of the largest objects ever listed on the Sentry Risk Table.

On 17 May 2005 it was designated as comet P/2005 JQ5 (Catalina). It was removed from the Sentry Risk Table on 7 June 2005. It was observed by Arecibo Observatory on 12 June 2005.

On 8 June 2036 the comet will pass  from Earth.

June epsilon Ophiuchids 
300P/Catalina is suspected of being the parent body of the minor June epsilon Ophiuchids meteor shower. There was an outburst of meteor activity from 19 June 2019 until 26 June 2019 when 88 June epsilon Ophiuchids were detected by the Cameras for Allsky Meteor Surveillance (CAMS) network. The June epsilon Ophiuchids created 50% of the fireball detections in the period 22–24 June. This outburst offers evidence of past activity of 300P/Catalina. The radiant is near 16:21 (245.2) -7.4 in the constellation of Ophiuchus. The June epsilon Ophiuchids radiate from a very large scattered radiant area and may be related to a number of other minor showers that have been identified. The meteors have a velocity of around 14 km/s.

References 
 

Periodic comets
300P
300P
0300

Near-Earth objects removed from the Sentry Risk Table
20050506